AFM Nazmul Huda is a Bangladesh Nationalist Party politician and the former Member of Parliament of Mymensingh-3.

Career
Huda was elected to parliament from Mymensingh-3 as a Bangladesh Nationalist Party candidate in 1979 and 1996. He also served as the President of Mymensingh Bar Association for a number of terms.

Death
Huda died on 31 December 2015.

References

Bangladesh Nationalist Party politicians
Living people
2nd Jatiya Sangsad members
6th Jatiya Sangsad members
7th Jatiya Sangsad members
Year of birth missing (living people)